This is the list of characters that appear in the manga DearS and its anime and video game adaptions.

Main characters

Takeya Ikuhara

Takeya Ikuhara is the unlikely protagonist of the series. A fastidious and impetuous student, his life becomes complicated when he becomes the unwanted target of affection and servility by a young female DearS, a citizen of the very people he dislikes. In spite of this rather immature prejudice, over the course of her stay and companionship with him, Takeya grows fond and solicitous of the girl, opening up more to his peers as well. Ren's role and mindset as a slave causes immense emotional friction for Takeya due to his view of her and other DearS as equals and causes him to question the motives of DearS, particularly Ren and her unclear affection. Takeya lives alone rurally in an apartment and is a sales associate at Bicep Videos, a video rental store. He is good friends with Neneko Izumi and Hikoro Oikawa and is the respective brother and stepson of Natsuki and Harumi Ikuhara. Back in the past, Takeya used to come over at Neneko's place often whenever his dad wasn't back from his job. During his frequent visits, Neneko used to make him watch Sci-Fi films, which, of course involved 'Aliens'. Takeya was always frightened of these films and over the years his fear of Aliens became hatred for Aliens, which makes it troublesome for him to actually accept DearS. He eventually realizes he is in love with Ren and goes to space with her and the rest of the DearS that followed Io.

Ren

Lost during shipment and freed from containment, Ren is found homeless by Takeya, who she immediately forces a covenant between and is subsequently given shelter by, much to his displeasure. Devoid of proper education, Ren is initially dysglossic and needy, but through curiosity and friends, becomes well versed in language and customs, even becoming admitted to Koharu High. As the self-proclaimed slave of Takeya, Ren is excessively altruistic to her unwelcome master, who prefers to view her as an equal than an inferior. Ren's feelings and her own desires become progressively clearer as time passes, but she is constantly confused by those emotions and is unsure of their meaning due to the idea that DearS are incapable of understanding the concept of love. After several instances of emotional displeasure due to Takeya's actions and his lack of attention for her, she finally realizes that she loves Takeya and wishes to always be with him out of her own will, rather than being with him because of her role as his slave. Ren is good friends with just about everyone, is capable of superhuman abilities and has an insatiable appetite for melonpan, as it was the first food that was fed to her by Takeya. At the end of the manga, she goes back into space with Takeya and the rest of the DearS that followed Io.

Neneko Izumi

Neneko Izumi is a droopy-eyed student and daughter of the apartment landlord, of which she is a tenant of. Neneko tends to have and retain the most level head of her peers when situations go awry, especially discrepancies between Takeya and Ren. Having grown up with Takeya, the two are childhood friends, despite their constant bickering, and is usually the one who is turned to for mentoring or advice. She was the one that caused Takeya to have a fear of aliens after showing him numerous Sci-Fi films when they were younger. Neneko also has a crush on Takeya and out of the entire main cast, she is the only bespectacled character. She has a hobby of making doll dresses and dreams of improving her skills and making her own original designs.

Miu

, better known by her short name Miu, is a young female DearS.

Intelligent yet sometimes conceited, Miu is a student who is assigned to study abroad at Koharu High and resides locally as a homestay. She is introduced to the group through a misunderstanding during her inauguration at school and, following a sour, rather pitiable acquaintance with Ren, invites herself to look after the oblivious girl, befriending her peers as well. Despite her proud genteel and brash disposition, Miu is in fact quite benign and empathetic, particularly when she can personally relate. Like her airheaded counterpart, Miu is capable of superhuman abilities and is respected by everyone. It is later revealed that Miu had a master before arriving on Earth, who was shot and killed much to Miu's shock. After an incident in which she and Takeya were stuck in a well, she is shown to have developed feelings for Takeya due to his virtuous nature and eventually confuses the concept of love as "gift" and makes Takeya her master. Also akin to Ren, Miu has trouble understanding her feelings for Takeya due to the belief that DearS can't love until the advice of several other characters, including Takeya himself, help her come to the realization that she does indeed love Takeya. She decided to go back into space with Io and the other DearS that chose to follow her in order to give up on her love for Takeya, but is shocked when both Takeya and Ren decide to accompany them.

Supporting characters

 
The main characters' knockout teacher, Mitsuka-sensei is both intelligent and resourceful. She is also a shamelessly flirtatious exhibitionist who spends more time conniving to "show off" to her students than she does teaching them English (Spanish in the English manga). Mitsuka has a habit of popping up when it is least convenient to Takeya and company, turning normal conversations into overly embarrassing situations, usually by mistaking most things for sexual acts. At times though, she does show surprising insight concerning the relationships of others, especially between Ren and Takeya. She also does work as a porn actress (A whole corner in the adult section of the video rental store Takeya is working in is devoted to films with her).

 
 A male friend of Takeya's — though apart from being in the same class, the two have little in common. The #1 member of the "DearS Love Club", "Oihiko" (Oikawa Hikorō) is extremely interested in DearS, particularly (or, especially) female DearS and harbors an especially deep infatuation with Ren. Though goofy, and more than a little shallow, at heart he remains a decent young man.

 
 A male DearS exchange student who goes to the same school as Takeya's sister Natsuki. He is something of a black sheep amongst the DearS colony and is generally soft-spoken. It is perhaps for this reason that he is considered the DearS' diplomatic negotiator, and is often sent on assignments to clear up various mix-ups and solve sensitive DearS-related matters, including bearing witness to a duel between Ren and Miu and retrieving the forgetful Nia from Takeya Ikuhara's apartment. His passive nature causes him to be abused by the son of family with whom he is living until Takeya's words of encouragement boosts his confidence and provides a clear definition of a friend, which in turn help hims stand up for himself to stop the abuse. He stays behind on Earth when Io takes many DearS with her into space. Of the DearS that have an affinity for Takeya, Khi is the most level-headed among the group and is able to understand and accept his feelings.

 
 Takeya's little sister who has been away overseas. She cozies up to Ren at first, but after hearing Ren refer to herself as Takeya's "slave", she starts to hate Ren and pummels her big brother for "being a pervert". Initially spiteful of DearS due to Ren's relationship with her brother, Natsuki eventually comes to accept them because of her friendship with Khi and eventually Nia as well. Takeya has shown to be protective of her and has even expressed displeasure at the possibility of her and Khi becoming more than friends.

 
 Takeya's stepmother and one of the few people who can keep the rambunctious Natsuki in line. She taught Natsuki all of the techniques that she uses to beat her big brother up with, or so it appears. It is also implied that Takeya and Harumi could have fallen in love, but before Takeya can say these words Harumi sticks a cherry tomato in his mouth and says "It doesn't matter now I am your mother" (Another indication was when Takeya turned to Neneko in panic as Ren was prepared to leave the Earth, she stated that Harumi dumped him). Harumi is a truly funny character with her own "personal attacks", such as the "Harumi driver".

 
 The somewhat dominatrix-like "Barker", she is second-in-command of the DearS colony. Quite big-breasted like Ren, she is almost never seen without her whip in hand. She has proven to be strict, and often cruel, particularly to Khi, using her whip on him to express her displeasure. She assigns the "Biter" Nia to retrieve Ren. She is subservient to Fina and stays with her on Earth.

 
 The "Biter" sent by the DearS colony to retrieve Ren. Unlike the other DearS, he is tall and muscular, and apparently quite versed in hand-to-hand combat — or so we hear. He is also a mentor to cat-like DearS Nia, who aspires to become a Biter herself. He believes he is the gift for Hirofumi, which leads to some awkward situations. He develops an attachment to Hirofumi, much to his horror, scaring the girls away from him.

 
 Nia is Xaki's catlike apprentice. She is quite a flake, and often forgets her assignments, even the ones she assigns herself, such as challenging Ren when Xaki fails to retrieve the wayward Zero Number. As seen in some parts of the anime, she is also quite klutzy, but agile when she needs to be. She manages to befriend both Takeya and his little sister Natsuki, and when Ren is kidnapped by Rubi in the manga, Nia even helps Takeya venture inside the DearS ship to find her. She always ends her sentences with her trademark nonsense syllable "nii" (her own name in the English dub). She decided to join Io into outer space as Xaki, her teacher, stays behind.

Minor characters

 
 The playboy of Koharu High School and highly suggested that he sleeps with many of the girls at school, referring it to them having some "coffee". When Takeya's actions put Ren in doubt of his feelings for her, Hiro tries to seduce her away from her master. Even when he admits to "really liking" Ren, (the closest he'll ever admit to loving someone), Ren still only thinks of him as a friend. Eventually, Hiro gives up on her, and to his horror, Xaki has now formed an attachment to him, and makes any girl too scared to approach Hiro. In the Japanese version, Hiro-kun usually call girls "Koneko-chan" whatever their real names are. The word means something close to "kitten".

 Manga only
 A DearS visiting from another town. She seems to speak with a Kansai dialect, meaning she might be homestaying in a town near Osaka. She also forms a friendship with Natsuki right off the bat, even helping her sell takoyaki at the Koharu Summer Festival. She stays on Earth when the option is presented.

 Known as "Lady Fina" to the other DearS, her official position is that of the "Watcher", and she seems to be the de facto leader of the DearS colony; even Rubi bows to her. She does not awaken until volume 5 of the manga, and seems to support Takeya taking Ren in as his slave. In fact, she immediately orders Rubi to stop trying to recapture Ren.

Fina seems to be the oldest of the DearS seen so far, and knows almost everything there is to know about the DearS and their "society". Fina can be quite flaky. She also seems to be narcoleptic, seeming to always doze off at the most inopportune times. Eventually, she decides to stay behind on Earth to watch over the DearS that remain on the planet.

 
 China was a main character in PlayStation 2 game, but she made a small appearance in the final episode of the anime and appears in the manga for several chapters. Like Ren, she is also a "Zero Numbers" and much younger than any of the DearS previously seen. She is known to Earthling scientists as "Sample B7", and has been charged with retrieving another escaped "Zero Numbers", only known as "Sample A2". During her very brief foray into the outside world she mistakes Ren for her target, and convinces Takeya to play at being a master to her. After her "date" with Takeya, China is put back to sleep, but before doing so, she expresses her wish for Takeya to truly be her master if she were ever to wake again. After she and the other zero numbers are released from hibernation, she decides to leave Earth to continue to be with Takeya when Io goes into outer space.

 Manga only
 A young DearS who appears to Takeya on the roof of his school in volume 6 of the manga. She can only say one word: "Ren". It is later revealed that she is the mysterious "Sample A2" that China was sent to retrieve. It is also revealed that her ability to manipulate gravity is phenomenally powerful — strong enough to levitate Takeya's entire apartment building. She may also possess the ability of teleportation. She eventually matures into the second DearS Watcher, and decided to take her people in search of a new host populace.

 Takeya's father who only appears in the later volumes of the manga. He's a scientist who had discovered that Ren was the key to saving the DearS. After finding this information out, he begged Ren to sacrifice herself to save the 150 DearS and the entire human species. As stated by Io, there was no point to this.

References

DearS